Riverside High School (RHS) is a public high school in Painesville Township, Ohio, United States. It is part of the Riverside Local School District.

Logo infringement 
In 2010, Oregon State University forced Riverside High School and the Riverside Local School District to change their Beaver mascot logo because of copyright concerns.

Notable alumni 
 Mike Celizic, author and columnist
 Dan O'Shannon, television writer and producer
 Scott Shafer, football coach
 Jason Short, NFL player

References

External links 
 

High schools in Lake County, Ohio
Public high schools in Ohio